Saints Vincent, Orontius, and Victor (d. 305 AD) are venerated as martyrs by the Roman Catholic and Orthodox Churches. Tradition states that Vincent and Orontius were brothers from Cimiez.  They were Christians who evangelized in the Pyrenees and were killed at Puigcerda with Saint Victor.

Vincent should not be confused with the more famous Vincent of Saragossa, who is honored on the same feast day.

Veneration
Their relics were enshrined at Embrun, in a sanctuary built by Palladius of Embrun.

References 

Saints from Hispania
Saints trios
305 deaths
4th-century Christian martyrs
4th-century Romans
Gallo-Roman saints
People from Nice
Year of birth unknown
Groups of Christian martyrs of the Roman era